The men's Greco-Roman featherweight competition at the 1948 Summer Olympics in London took place from 3 August to 6 August at the Empress Hall, Earls Court Exhibition Centre. Nations were limited to one competitor.

This Greco-Roman wrestling competition continued to use the "bad points" elimination system introduced at the 1928 Summer Olympics for Greco-Roman and at the 1932 Summer Olympics for freestyle wrestling, with the slight modification introduced in 1936. Each round featured all wrestlers pairing off and wrestling one bout (with one wrestler having a bye if there were an odd number). The loser received 3 points if the loss was by fall or unanimous decision and 2 points if the decision was 2-1 (this was the modification from prior years, where all losses were 3 points). The winner received 1 point if the win was by decision and 0 points if the win was by fall. At the end of each round, any wrestler with at least 5 points was eliminated.

Results

Round 1

 Bouts

 Points

Round 2

 Bouts

 Points

Round 3

 Bouts

 Points

Round 4

 Bouts

 Points

Round 5

 Bouts

 Points

Round 6

Of the three remaining wrestlers, Oktav had previously defeated Anderberg but Tóth had faced neither. Oktav received the bye in the sixth round. Anderberg beat Tóth, eliminating the latter. With two men who had already faced each left, previous head-to-head results were decisive and Oktav received the gold medal. (A Tóth victory over Anderberg in this round would have set up a seventh round pitting Tóth against Oktav.)

 Bouts

 Points

References

Wrestling at the 1948 Summer Olympics